Goodenia janamba is a species of flowering plant in the family Goodeniaceae and is endemic to northern Australia. It is an erect herb with linear to lance-shaped leaves mostly at the base of the plant, and umbels or racemes of flowers that are yellow, or purplish with a yellow centre.

Description

Taxonomy and naming
Goodenia janamba was first formally described in 1990 by Roger Charles Carolin in the journal Telopea from material he collected in 1968 near the South Alligator River on the road to Gunbalanya. The specific epithet (janamba) is an Aboriginal word meaning "crocodile", referring to the type location.

Distribution and habitat
This goodenia grows in open woodland in the northern Kimberley region of Western Australia, in Arnhem Land and in nearby parts of Queensland.

Conservation status
Goodenia janambais classified as "Priority One" by the Government of Western Australia Department of Parks and Wildlife, meaning that it is known from only one or a few locations which are potentially at risk, but as of "least concern" under the Queensland Government Nature Conservation Act 1992 and the Northern Territory Government Territory Parks and Wildlife Conservation Act 1976.

References

janamba
Eudicots of Western Australia
Flora of the Northern Territory
Flora of Queensland
Plants described in 1990
Taxa named by Roger Charles Carolin
Endemic flora of Western Australia